Alkanindiges illinoisensis is an aerobic, catalase-positive, squalane-degrading, non-spore-forming, nonmotile bacterium of the genus Alkanindiges, which was isolated from oilfield soils.

References

External links
Type strain of Alkanindiges illinoisensis at BacDive -  the Bacterial Diversity Metadatabase
 	

Moraxellaceae
Bacteria described in 2003